An election to Dún Laoghaire–Rathdown County Council took place on 10 June 1999 as part of that year's Irish local elections. 28 councillors were elected from six local electoral areas on the system of proportional representation by means of the single transferable vote (PR-STV) for a five-year term of office.

Results by party

Results by electoral area

Ballybrack

Blackrock

Dundrum

Dún Laoghaire

Glencullen

Stillorgan

External links
 Official website

1999
1999